Sockeye is a species of salmon.

Sockeye may also refer to:

USCGC Sockeye (WPB-87337), a United States Coast Guard cutter
Seattle Sockeye, a men's ultimate team based in Seattle, Washington, US
Richmond Sockeyes, an ice hockey team from Richmond, British Columbia, Canada

See also
Sockeye Fire, a 2015 wildfire in Alaska, US